The Downtown Danville Historic District is a national historic district located at Danville, Virginia. The district includes 48 contributing buildings in the central business district of Danville.  It includes a wide range of commercial, industrial, and institutional building types dating from the 1870s to the present. The district includes notable examples of the Late Gothic Revival, Tudor Revival, and Romanesque Revival styles. Notable buildings include the Danville City Auditorium (1932), Morotock Manufacturing Company (1907), J. T. Stovall Tobacco Factory (1876), Kingoff Building (1892), American National Bank & Trust Co (c. 1934), Woolworth's Building (1937), Southern Amusement Building (1922), Elks Home (1912), Danville Post Office (1932), Masonic Building (1921-1922), and Danville City Market (1930s).  Located in the district are the separately listed Hotel Danville and the Danville Municipal Building.

It was listed on the National Register of Historic Places in 1993.

References

National Register of Historic Places in Danville, Virginia
Historic districts on the National Register of Historic Places in Virginia
Buildings and structures in Danville, Virginia